Microseris sylvatica is a species of flowering plant in the family Asteraceae known by the common names sylvan scorzonella and woodland silverpuffs. It is endemic to California, where it has a scattered distribution throughout the central California Coast Ranges and inland mountain ranges, including the Sierra Nevada of the state. Its habitat includes grassland and openings in wooded areas.

Description
This is a perennial herb growing up to 75 centimeters tall. The leaves are up to 35 centimeters in length and wavy, toothed, or lobed along the edges. The inflorescence is borne on an erect peduncle, the flower head containing up to 70 yellow ray florets.

The fruit is an achene with a pale body up to a centimeter long. At the tip of the body is a large pappus made up of several long, barbed, bristly scales each up to a centimeter in length themselves.

External links
Jepson Manual Treatment — Microseris sylvatica
USDA Plants Profile: Microseris sylvatica
Flora of North America
California Native Plant Society Rare Plant Profile — Microseris sylvatica
Microseris sylvatica — U.C. Photo gallery

sylvatica
Endemic flora of California
Flora of the Sierra Nevada (United States)
Natural history of the California chaparral and woodlands
Natural history of the California Coast Ranges
Natural history of the Central Valley (California)
Natural history of the Transverse Ranges
Flora without expected TNC conservation status